The Varuna River is a minor tributary of the Ganges River in Uttar Pradesh, India. It originates at Phulpur in the Prayagraj district and merges into the Ganges near Sarai Mohana in the Varanasi district. The  stretch between Sarai Mohana and Sadar , Varanasi, Uttar Pradesh is prone to flooding. The name 'Varanasi' is originated from the name of two rivers, Varuna and Assi.

According to the Vamana Purana, the river was created by the gods alongside the Asi River. It is also mentioned in the Mahabharata.

References

Varanasi
Rivers of Uttar Pradesh
Tributaries of the Ganges
Rivers of India